Skeleton Coast National Park is a national park located in northwest Namibia, and has the most inaccessible shores, dotted with shipwrecks. The park is divided into a northern and southern section, the southern section is open to those with 4 wheel drive vehicles, they are allowed to go up (north) as far as the Ugab River Gate (where a sign with a skull and crossbones warns you to go no further). The northern section can only be reached by a fly-in safari, and the area is off-limits to all vehicles.

The list of tourist attractions in the park includes a shipwreck at the South West Seal viewpoint, Huab lagoon and the collapsed oil drilling rig.

See also
 List of national parks of Namibia
 Skeleton Coast

Notes
This park is to be included in the Iona – Skeleton Coast Transfrontier Conservation Area.

References

National parks of Namibia
1971 establishments in South West Africa
1971 establishments in South Africa
Protected areas established in 1971